Ben Laurie is an English software engineer. He is currently the Director of Security at The Bunker Secure Hosting.

Laurie wrote Apache-SSL, the basis of most SSL-enabled versions of the Apache HTTP Server. He developed the MUD Gods, which was innovative in including online creation in its endgame.

Laurie also has written several articles, papers and books, and is interested in ideal knots and their applications.

Laurie was a member of WikiLeaks' Advisory Board. According to Laurie, he had little involvement with WikiLeaks, and didn't know who ran the site other than Julian Assange. In 2009, he also said he wouldn't trust WikiLeaks to protect him if he were a whistleblower because "the things that Wikileaks relies on are not sufficiently strong to defend against" a government's resources.

References

External links
 

Computer security specialists
Cypherpunks
Google employees
MUD developers
Alumni of King's College, Cambridge
Place of birth missing (living people)
WikiLeaks
Year of birth missing (living people)
Living people